England have participated five times at the FIFA Women's World Cup: in 1995, 2007, 2011, 2015 and 2019. They have reached the quarter-finals three times and the semi-finals twice.

1991 World Cup
England did not qualify for the 1991 FIFA Women's World Cup. The European qualification tournament was the same as the European Championship Qualification. England finished second in their bracket at the group stage and qualified for the quarter-finals. In the quarter-final they lost twice to Germany: 1–4 at home, and 0–2 away. As a result, Germany qualified for the World Cup.

1995 World Cup 
For the World Cup in Sweden, England qualified as the semi-finalist of the European Championship 1995. In the Qualification, England had four wins against Belgium and Slovenia and two goalless draws against Spain. In the quarter-finals, England prevailed with two 2-1 victories against Iceland and was thus qualified for the World Cup. In the semi-finals they lost to Germany 1–4 in the first leg and 1–2 in the second leg.

They defeated Canada 3–2 in their first World Cup match. Gillian Coultard scored in the 51st minute by a converted penalty the first World Cup goal for England. After increasing to 3–0 they conceded two late goals. A 2–0 win over Norway followed by a 3–2 victory over Nigeria put England in the quarter-finals as group winners. Here they again lost to Germany 0–3. The result would have been sufficient for England to have qualified for the first women's football tournament at the 1996 Olympic Games in which only the eight best teams of the World Cup could participate. However, because England is not eligible to start at the Olympic Games, Brazil participated as the ninth-best team.

Group B

Quarter-finals

1999 World Cup
For the 1999 FIFA Women's World Cup, for the first time, UEFA set up separate qualifiers. England met the two finalists from 1995, Norway and Germany, as well as the Netherlands. England won only the home game against the Dutch women 1–0 and lost all other games. Thus, England was eliminated at the group stage.

2003 World Cup
In the qualification for the 2003 FIFA Women's World Cup England again faced Germany and the Netherlands, as well as Portugal. With two wins and two draws, England qualified as a runner-up behind Germany (which qualified directly for the World Cup) for the relegation matches. There they first met Iceland and after a 2–2 in Iceland earned a 1–0 home win to make the relegation final against France. England lost both games 0–1, and thus did not qualify for the World Cup.

2007 World Cup
The 2007 FIFA Women's World Cup took place for the second time in China. In the qualification England met France, the Netherlands, Austria and Hungary. With six victories – including England's largest ever victory, a 13–0 defeat of Hungary – and two draws, England reached the World Cup for the second time.

In the first game of the finals, they met Japan and had a 2–1 lead in the 5th minute of stoppage time when Japan scored a late equalizer. The second game against Germany was a scoreless tie. In the last match against Argentina England won 6–1 and qualified for the quarter-finals, as Japan lost to Germany in a parallel game. In the quarter-finals they held the United States to a 0–0 tie for 50 minutes, but lost 3–0. Thus, England were eliminated in the quarter-finals, as in 1995. However, they were the only team to not lose to the eventual champion Germany. By making the quarter-finals England had actually secured qualification for the women's football tournament at the 2008 Summer Olympics, in which only the three best European teams of the World Cup could participate. However, as England still could not start at the Olympics, Sweden and Denmark, who were both eliminated in the preliminary round, played for this place, and Sweden won.

Group A

Quarter-finals

2011 World Cup

For the 2011 FIFA Women's World Cup in Germany qualifying, England earned seven wins and a draw playing against Spain, Austria, Turkey and Malta for the playoffs of the group winners. In the playoffs, England defeated Switzerland 2–0 and 3–2 to earn a place in the World Cup.

In Germany, England was put into a group with Japan, New Zealand and Mexico. In the first game against Mexico, England tied 1:1. England defeated New Zealand 2-1 and Japan 2–0 to take England's first ever group victory at a World Cup. In the quarter-finals England played France. England took the lead in the 59th minute after a scoreless first half, but France equalized two minutes before the end of regular time. In the ensuing overtime, neither team scored, leading to a penalty shoot-out. Although the first French shooter failed and the first three English women were successful, all other French women scored and the last two English women, Claire Rafferty and captain Faye White, did not. England were the only team to have defeated the eventual champion Japan.

Group B

Quarter-finals

2015 World Cup
In the qualification for the 2015 FIFA Women's World Cup, England prevailed again. Their group included Ukraine, Wales, Turkey, Belarus and Montenegro. England won all 10 games to qualify.

England was assigned to Group F with France, Colombia and, like four years earlier, Mexico.

In a close game, they lost 1–0 to France, but followed that with four straight 2–1 wins. First against Mexico, then against Colombia with which they qualified as a runner-up for the knockout round, and then in the first-round playoff match against Norway, thus for the first time winning in a knockout game at the World Cup. In the quarter-finals, where England had never before won, they met host Canada and prevailed 2–1. They thus made the semi-finals for the first time, where they met the defending champion, Japan. England lost with an own goal in injury time, but won the match for third place against Germany for their highest ever finish.

Group F

Round of 16

Quarter-finals

Semi-finals

Third place play-off

2019 World Cup
In the qualification for the 2019 FIFA Women's World Cup in Europe, England met Wales, Russia, Bosnia and Herzegovina and, for the first time, Kazakhstan. England only earned a point in the home game against Wales in a goalless draw. Crucial for the qualification then was a 3–0 victory in front of a record 5,053 spectators against Wales on the penultimate match day.

England had started their qualifications under Mark Sampson, who led them to third place in 2015 and the semi-finals at the European Championship in 2017. In September 2017, he was released after the first game due to various allegations. Mo Marley initially coached the team until former England international Phil Neville took over as coach in January 2018.

At the World Cup, the first game was against Scotland, which England won 2–1. Argentina and Japan followed, with a 1–0 result against Argentina and 2–0 against Japan, making England group winners. In the knockout rounds, England won 3–0 against Cameroon, then won against Norway in the quarter-finals, with Ellen White scoring her sixth World Cup goal. In the semi-final White scored again, but the team lost 1–2 to the United States. It was the first FIFA Women's World Cup shown on BBC.

Group D

Round of 16

Quarter-finals

Semi-finals

Third place play-off

2023 World Cup

Group D

World Cup record

*Draws include knockout matches decided by penalty shoot-outs.

Goalscorers

 Own goals scored for opponents
 Laura Bassett (scored for Japan in 2015)

Notes

References

 
World Cup
Countries at the FIFA Women's World Cup